Jeffrey Warren Niemann (born February 28, 1983) is an American former professional baseball starting pitcher. He played in Major League Baseball (MLB) for the Tampa Bay Rays from 2008 to 2012.

High school
Niemann attended Lamar High School.

College
Niemann, who stands , was the fourth starter for Rice University in his freshman season of 2002, usually starting midweek non-conference games. He posted a 5–1 record with a 3.11 ERA, including a victory over Washington in the decisive seventh game of the 2002 NCAA regional at Rice's Reckling Park. In 2003, he stepped into Rice's weekend rotation and quickly became the nation's most dominant pitcher. He finished the season 17–0 with a 1.70 ERA and 156 strikeouts, being named Western Athletic Conference Pitcher of the Year, a consensus first-team all-American, and a finalist for the Rotary Smith Award in helping Rice to its first national championship. In 2002 and 2003, he played collegiate summer baseball with the Harwich Mariners of the Cape Cod Baseball League.

Niemann battled injuries as a junior in 2004, but still went 6–3 with a 3.02 ERA in 11 starts, including a complete game victory over Texas A&M in the NCAA regional. The entire Rice weekend rotation, including Philip Humber, Wade Townsend, and Niemann, were all selected in the first eight picks of the 2004 Major League Baseball Draft – the first time three teammates had ever gone so early in the same draft.

Professional
Niemann was the Rays' first-round draft pick out of Rice University in 2004 as the fourth overall pick. He signed a major league contract in January 2005 worth $5.2 million. Niemann opened the 2005 season at Single-A Advanced Visalia, where he went 0–1 with a 3.98 ERA in five starts. After a promotion to the Double-A Montgomery Biscuits, he went 0–1 with a 4.35 ERA in six appearances, including three starts. He had offseason surgery in 2005 to shave the joint between his collarbone and shoulder and returned to Montgomery in 2006. Flanked in the rotation by starting pitchers Andy Sonnanstine and Mitch Talbot during the Southern League playoffs, Niemann helped lead the Biscuits to the 2006 championship. Following the 2006 season, Baseball America named Niemann the Rays' fourth-best prospect, following Delmon Young, Evan Longoria, and Reid Brignac; they also said Niemann possessed the best slider of any pitcher in the Rays' organization.

Niemann spent the  season with the Triple-A Durham Bulls. In 25 appearances, all starts, he compiled a 12–6 record and a 3.98 ERA. He was selected to the All-Star Futures Game.

Niemann made his major league debut on April 13, against the Baltimore Orioles, pitching 6 innings en route to his first career win.

Niemann's team leading 13–6 record and 3.94 ERA in 2009 earned him a place in national AL Rookie of the Year Award discussions. The Tampa Bay Chapter of the Baseball Writers' Association of America named him the Rookie of the Year for the Rays for the 2009 season in a unanimous decision by the voters.

In 2012, Niemann got hit with a come-backer by Adam Lind of the Blue Jays on May 14, 2012 which fractured his leg. He was expected to miss 4-6 weeks with the injury.

On April 10, 2013, Niemann underwent right shoulder surgery, which caused him to miss the 2013 season. He became a free agent after the season.

References

External links

1983 births
Living people
People from Houston
Lamar High School (Houston, Texas) alumni
Baseball players from Texas
Major League Baseball pitchers
Tampa Bay Rays players
Durham Bulls players
Rice Owls baseball players
Harwich Mariners players
Visalia Oaks players
Montgomery Biscuits players
Charlotte Stone Crabs players
All-American college baseball players